Nicolás Remigio Aurelio Avellaneda Silva (3 October 1837 – 24 November 1885) was an Argentine politician and journalist, and President of Argentina from 1874 to 1880. Avellaneda's main projects while in office were banking and education reform, leading to Argentina's economic growth. The most important events of his government were the Conquest of the Desert and the transformation of the Buenos Aires into a federal district.

His grandson was José Domingo Molina Gómez, who took presidency when Juan Perón was captured.

Biography
Born in San Miguel de Tucumán, his mother moved with him to Bolivia after the death of his father, Marco Avellaneda, during a revolt against Juan Manuel de Rosas. He studied law at Córdoba, without graduating. Back at Tucumán he founded El Eco del Norte, and moved to Buenos Aires in 1857, becoming director of the El Nacional and editor of El Comercio de la Plata. He finished his studies at Buenos Aires, meeting Domingo Faustino Sarmiento. Sarmiento helped him to become teacher of economy at the University of Buenos Aires. He wrote "Estudio sobre las leyes de tierras públicas", proposing to give the lands to producers that make production from them. This system, similar to the one employed at the United States, suggested to reduce bureaucracy and pointed that this would allow stable populations and population growth.

He was a member of the house of representatives in 1859 and Minister of Government of Adolfo Alsina in the Buenos Aires province in 1866. During Domingo Faustino Sarmiento's presidency, he was Minister of Justice and Education. He implemented the educational reform that was defining of his government.

Avellaneda attained the presidency in 1874 but had its legitimacy contested by Bartolomé Mitre and supported by Domingo Faustino Sarmiento. Mitre deployed the army against Avellaneda but was defeated by Julio Argentino Roca. Mitre was held prisoner and judged by military justice, but Avellaneda indulged him in order to promote pacification. He also included Rufino de Elizalde and José María Gutiérrez, supporters of Mitre, as members of his cabinet.

In line with people like Alberdi or Sarmiento, who thought that European immigration was crucial to the Argentine development, he promoted the "Avellaneda law" that allowed European farmers ease to get terrains. The immigration numbers were doubled in a few years.

Having won the revolution and bringing peace to the country, Avellaneda faced the serious economic crisis, centering his efforts on the control of the land with the Conquest of the Desert and expanding the railroads, the cereal and meat exports, and the European immigration, specially to Patagonia. During his presidency, the economy of Argentina was seriously affected by the European crisis putting the country on the edge of debt default. Deciding to take Argentina from its debts, he said that "[...]there are two million Argentines who would economize even to their hunger and thirst to fulfill the promises of our public commitments in the foreign markets". He reduced the budget and applied a weak protectionism. The crisis was eventually fixed with the growing exports of refrigerated meat to Europe, a new developing industrial method of the time.

A prolific writer, his works have been published in 12 volumes.

Aged 37, he was the youngest Argentine president ever elected. He had served in the Argentine Senate for five months in 1874 and returned to the Senate in 1883 until his death. He died on a ship returning from medical treatment in France.

Bibliography

References

External links

1837 births
1885 deaths
Presidents of Argentina
National University of Córdoba alumni
19th-century Argentine lawyers
19th-century Argentine novelists
People from San Miguel de Tucumán
Members of the Argentine Senate for Tucumán
Members of the Argentine Chamber of Deputies elected in Tucumán
Burials at La Recoleta Cemetery
National Autonomist Party politicians
People who died at sea